Paul Maye (19 August 1913 – 19 April 1987) was a French professional road bicycle racer. Maye shares the record of three Paris–Tours victories. He won the 1945 Paris–Roubaix.

Major results

1934
 national amateur road race championships
1935
 national military road race championships
1936
Bordeaux-Saint-Jean d'Angély
Tour de France
Winner stages 10 and 19C
1935
 national road race championships
1941
Paris–Tours
Circuit de Paris
1942
Paris–Tours
Circuit de Paris
1943
 national road race championships
1945
Paris–Roubaix
Paris–Tours

References

External links 

Official Tour de France results for Paul Maye

French male cyclists
1913 births
1987 deaths
French Tour de France stage winners
Sportspeople from Bayonne
Cyclists from Nouvelle-Aquitaine